|}

The Winter Derby is a Group 3 flat horse race in Great Britain open to horses aged four years or older. It is run over a distance of 1 mile and 2 furlongs at Lingfield Park in February or March.

History
The event was established in 1998, and the inaugural edition was won by Running Stag. It was given Listed status in 1999, and promoted to Group 3 level in 2006.

The Winter Derby is run on a Polytrack surface. It is one of four non-turf Group races in Britain, along with the Chipchase Stakes, September Stakes and the Sirenia Stakes. It is currently the country's first Group race of the year.

Records
Most successful horse:
 no horse has won this race more than once

Leading jockey (4 wins):
 Frankie Dettori – Parasol (2003), Caluki (2004), Wissahickon (2019), Dubai Warrior (2020)

Leading trainer (4 wins):
 John Gosden - Wissahickon (2019), Dubai Warrior (2020), Forest of Dean (2021), Lord North (2023)

Winners

See also
 Horse racing in Great Britain
 List of British flat horse races

References
 Racing Post:
 galopp-sieger.de – Winter Derby.
 horseracingintfed.com – International Federation of Horseracing Authorities – Winter Derby (2018).
 pedigreequery.com – Winter Derby – Lingfield.

Open middle distance horse races
Lingfield Park Racecourse
Flat races in Great Britain
1998 establishments in England
Recurring sporting events established in 1998